There is a large variety of wildflowers native to Indiana. The following list is an incomplete list of native perennial flowering plant species.

Wildflowers by scientific name

Achillea millefolium, common yarrow
Acorus calamus, sweet flag
Actaea pachypoda, white baneberry
Aquilegia canadensis, eastern red columbine
Arisaema triphyllum, jack-in-the-pulpit
Aruncus dioicus, goat's beard
Asarum canadense, wild ginger
Asclepias tuberosa, butterfly weed
Asclepias syriaca, common milkweed
Aster novae-angliae, New England aster
Baptisia lactea, white false indigo
Caltha palustris, marsh-marigold
Caulophyllum thalictroides, blue cohosh (barberry)
Chelone glabra, white turtlehead
Cimicifuga racemosa, black snakeroot
Dicentra cucullaria, Dutchman's breeches
Dodecatheon meadia, eastern shooting star
Eupatorium fistulosum, Joe-Pye weed
Eupatorium perfoliatum, boneset
Euphorbia corollata, flowering spurge
Filipendula rubra, queen-of-the-prairie
Geranium maculatum, wild geranium
Hypericum, goatweed
Iris cristata, crested iris
Iris pseudacorus, yellow iris
Helianthus tuberosus, Jerusalem artichoke
Liatris spicata, prairie gay feather
Lobelia siphilitica, great blue lobelia
Lysimachia nummularia, moneywort
Lysimachia punctata, large yellow loosestrife
Mertensia virginica, Virginia bluebells
Monarda didyma, crimson beebalm
Phlox divaricata, wild blue phlox
Polemonium reptans, Jacob's ladder
Polygonatum biflorum, Solomon's seal
Rudbeckia hirta, black-eyed Susan
Rudbeckia triloba, brown-eyed susan
Sanguinaria canadensis, bloodroot
Sedum ternatum, woodland stonecrop
Stylophorum diphyllum, woods-poppy
Tiarella cordifolia, heartleaf foamflower
Trillium, Trillium 
Vernonia noveboracensis, New York ironweed
Viola papilionacea, blue violet
Xanthorhiza simplicissima, yellowroot
Yucca glauca, Great Plains yucca

Bibliography
Homoya, Michael Allison. Orchids of Indiana. United States: Indiana University Press, 1993.
Runkel, Sylvan T.., Bull, Alvin F.. Wildflowers of Indiana Woodlands. United States: Iowa State University Press, 1994.
Wampler, Fred., Wampler, Maryrose. Wildflowers of Indiana. United States: Indiana University Press, 1988.
Yatskievych, Kay. Field Guide to Indiana Wildflowers. United States: Indiana University Press, 2000.

External links
Wildflowers of Indiana

Indiana